Luo Changqing, a 70-year-old  cleaner, died from head injuries sustained after he was hit by a brick thrown by a Hong Kong protester during a violent confrontation between two groups in Sheung Shui, Hong Kong on 13 November 2019. Following his injuries, he was taken to Prince of Wales Hospital, Sha Tin, where he died the next day. This incident was described as the first fatality directly attributed to the Hong Kong protests that began in 2019.

Victim
The victim was identified as Luo Changqing, a 70-year-old man, who worked as a government-contracted cleaner. He was an outsourced worker of the Food and Environmental Hygiene Department. The police found that Luo had no political background or inclination and was not a member of an organisation. The Federation of Hong Kong Shenzhen Associations said that he was born and raised in Hong Kong.

Incident

On 13 November 2019, a conflict between opposing groups took place on Lung Wan Street, outside the North District Town Hall, in Sheung Shui. Around noon, several people were trying to clear bricks left by protesters on the street. They were described by media outlets as residents of Sheung Shui or government supporters. However, a group of protesters appeared and argued with the group who were clearing bricks, after which the violent confrontation between the two sides erupted. During this encounter, the protesters had left after a few minutes of arguing and then came back with a group of about 30 protesters.
 
The fight between the two groups broke out at 11.52 am. It involved both parties hurling bricks at each other. The protesters were dressed in black, wore masks over their faces, and carried umbrellas used as protection for the fight. The incident lasted for about a minute, after which the protesters retreated under the shelter of their umbrellas.

Luo was part of the group who were clearing the street. He was also helping to clear the street, while he was taking his lunch break. The location was about 300 metres away from his workplace. During the confrontation, he was using his mobile phone to record the conflict. He did not participate in the brick throwing.

Luo was hit by a brick thrown by one of the black-clad protesters. He lost consciousness after he was hit and did not regain it before he died. He was transported to the North District Hospital and then transferred to the Prince of Wales Hospital, where he was admitted to the neurosurgery high-dependency unit. Luo's family arrived from mainland China, after which the Hong Kong Police Force escorted them to Luo who was then still unconscious at the Prince of Wales Hospital.

Luo died in the Prince of Wales Hospital at 10:51 pm on 14 November 2019. His death is described as the first fatality directly attributed to the 2019–2020 Hong Kong protests.

Aftermath

The area near the location where Luo Changqing was killed, outside the North District Town Hall, became a memorial to him. On 15 November 2019, a public vigil for Luo was held at the site. However, a few days later, the on-site memorial was vandalised by unknown perpetrators.

On 22 November, members of Luo's family themselves went to the site to mourn for their deceased family member. They previously wanted to remain anonymous, citing concerns about their personal safety, but eventually went public with the support of the Hong Kong Federation of Trade Unions (HKFTU). Luo's funeral was held on the same day. His relatives said that he would be buried on a family plot in mainland China. The HKFTU stated that, upon the family's request, Luo would be buried next to his father in Hunan.

Over hundred thousand people from mainland China, including the Chinese actor Huang Xiaoming, donated to funds set up in support of the families of Luo and a 57-year-old man named Lee Chi-cheung who was set on fire during an argument with protesters. Hong Kong businessman and former legislator Kennedy Wong (Wong Ying-ho), who co-founded a fund in support of citizens and small and medium-sized enterprises affected by the unrest, announced that they would look at how their fund could be used to help Luo's family.

Responses
The Hong Kong Government said in a statement that they were saddened by the incident and that the police will work to bring the offenders to justice. The Food and Environmental Hygiene Department released a statement, expressing profound sadness at the passing of its service worker and saying it was providing assistance to his family. The Secretary for Food and Health Sophia Chan (Chan Siu-chee) said in a statement that "I am deeply saddened and extend my condolences to the family."

The Citizens' Press Conference representing the protesters released a statement expressing their "extreme condolences" at the death of the old man and said that citizens should not wind up as sacrifices of political struggles regardless of their political viewpoints. "Only by solving the political issue through political means", the conference continued in the statement, "could the Hong Kong communist regime settle the conflicts and uncertainties, and end the needless sacrifices and tragedies."

The Hong Kong Liaison Office expressed its "deep condolences" and urged the Hong Kong people to "denounce violence and protect the rule of law and stability of society together." They reiterated their support for the Hong Kong government and police force, urging them to punish the culprits sternly in accordance to the law. The office characterised the attack as "an atrocity against humanity that was totally inhumane and unforgivable." In a commentary in the Chinese state-owned news agency Xinhua, this fatal incident was cited as one of the examples highlighting the violence perpetrated by "black-clad rioters" besetting Hong Kong's society.

Investigation

The case was initially classified as a wounding after Luo sustained the life-threatening injuries. The investigation was assigned to the New Territories North Regional Crime Unit. The case was later upgraded to a murder following his death, as the police believed that the attacker had "maliciously" and "deliberately" hit Luo with the brick. The case was referred to the Coroner's Court for follow-up. The police offered an HK$800,000 reward for information on the killer.

Senior Superintendent Chan Tin-chu said that the police collected footage from nearby CCTV cameras to assist with their investigation, but that they also found that some of the cameras had been damaged by protesters. He told reporters that "Those in black first threw metal rods and bricks at the residents while Luo was believed to have used a mobile phone to film the scene. Then someone in black darted forward and threw a brick at his head."

On 13 December 2019, five suspects—three men and two women, aged 15 to 18—were arrested in Sheung Shui and Tai Po in connection with murder, wounding, and participation in a riot. They were detained at the New Territories North Regional Headquarters in Tai Po for further inquiries. The police learned about these suspects after examination of online and CCTV footage of the area. They stated that some of the five suspects threw bricks and wounded people, but that no footage had shown that they threw bricks directly at the now-deceased man. They remarked that the five could have acted as accomplices in a joint enterprise when it comes to the murder case, but that further legal advice would be sought. They also said that one of them, a 16-year-old boy, had hurled bricks at a 61-year-old man whose left retina was damaged. The suspects were released on bail pending further inquiries and were required to report back to the police.

Two male teenagers have been criminally charged with murder. During investigations, the case was forwarded to the Department of Justice for consideration of the evidence after which prosecutors formally charged the two men. On 22 April 2020, Chan Yin-ting (aged 16) and Lau Tsz-lung (Kelvin Lau, aged 17) appeared at the Tuen Mun Magistrates' Court to face charges for the murder of Luo Changqing, rioting, and wounding with intent. Court documents said that Chan and Lau, along with others who currently remain unidentified, were responsible for the killing of Luo. They were remanded in custody, while the case was adjourned to 1 June at the Eastern Magistrates' Court where the case will be transferred to the High Court. The police said that the two were among six people—three male and three female, aged 15 to 18—arrested in December in connection with Luo's killing.

On 17 June 2020, the police released the photographs of 14 other suspects wanted in connection with Luo's death. Senior Inspector Wong Yiu-ming of the New Territories North Regional Crime Unit stated that "We have reasons to believe the 14 suspects are involved in the case," but did not give further details about the suspects or their roles, citing the ongoing legal proceedings.

In 2022, Chan Yin-ting and Lau Tsz-lung were convicted of rioting charges but cleared of manslaughter and wounding charges following a jury trial. Both Chan and Lau were sentenced to 5.5 years in jail.

See also
 Death of Chow Tsz-lok
 Death of Chan Yin-lam

References

Luo Changqing
2019 in Hong Kong
2019–2020 Hong Kong protests
2010s crimes in Hong Kong
Luo Changqing
Sheung Shui
November 2019 crimes in Asia